Nicholas Ian Craig (born 3 April 1969, Stockport) is a professional racing cyclist specialising in cross country mountain bike racing and cyclo-cross, and a multiple national champion.

Major results

Cyclo-cross
1994
 2nd National Championships
1995
 3rd National Championships
1996
 1st  National Championships
1998
 1st  National Championships
1999
 2nd National Championships
2002
 3rd National Championships
2004
 2nd National Championships
2005
 1st  National Championships
2007
 2nd National Championships

Mountain Bike
1999
 3rd National XC Championships
2000
 1st  National XC Championships
2002
 3rd National XC Championships
2003
 1st  National XC Championships
2005
 1st  National Marathon Championships
 2nd National XC Championships
2006
 1st  National Marathon Championships
 3rd National XC Championships
2007
 2nd National Marathon Championships
 3rd National XC Championships
2008
 2nd National Marathon Championships

References

1969 births
Living people
Cyclo-cross cyclists
English male cyclists
Cross-country mountain bikers
Marathon mountain bikers
Sportspeople from Stockport
Cyclists at the 2000 Summer Olympics
Olympic cyclists of Great Britain